Horns  is a 2010 dark fantasy novel by Joe Hill and is the author's second published novel. The novel also incorporates elements of contemporary fantasy, crime fiction, and Gothic fiction. It employs the third-person omniscient, nonlinear narrative in telling the story of Ig Perrish, who—in the aftermath of his girlfriend Merrin Williams' mysterious rape and murder—awakes one morning to find horns growing from his head and diabolical powers at his command.

Plot summary
The novel consists of fifty chapters grouped into five sections of ten chapters each, named as follows:

Hell
Twenty-six-year-old Ignatius "Ig" Perrish wakes up one morning after a drunken night (in the woods containing an old foundry, near where his girlfriend's corpse was discovered) to find that he has sprouted bony, sensitive horns from his temples. Ig is the second son of a renowned musician and the younger brother of a rising late-night TV star, Terry Perrish. Ig had position and security within his hometown of Gideon, New Hampshire, but the rape and murder of his girlfriend, Merrin Williams, changed all that. Despite his innocence, and although he was neither charged nor tried, Ig is largely considered guilty in public opinion.

As Ig leaves the apartment he shares with his friend with benefits, Glenna Nicholson, he notices that she is strangely honest with him about her desire to binge, her feelings about his unwanted presence, and the fact that she performed oral sex on a mutual high school friend of theirs, Lee Tourneau, the previous night. As Ig goes to a medical clinic to deal with the growth of his horns, he discovers that people have a sudden compulsion to blatantly express their ugliest and most animalistic urges, desires, and opinions to him, and that no one (neither those whom he already knows nor those he meets for the first time) seems surprised to see the horns. Moreover, when he makes skin-to-skin contact with individuals, he immediately learns their identities and some of their darkest secrets. They forget about their conversations with him as soon as they're over, as well as forgetting about the horns.

Ig also realizes that he can make people give in to the ugly urges they have—in fact, the horns pulse in a pleasurable fashion when he does so—but he cannot make them do things they do not already want to do. He experiences these revelations with the doctor he talks to, two previously acquainted police officers, his church's priest and a nun, and others he encounters. Going home, he discovers that his parents and grandmother detest him and believe him to be Merrin's killer; he then meets his brother, Terry, who seems to be the only sympathetic member of the Perrish family. Under the influence of the horns' power, Terry confesses that he knows who killed Merrin: Ig's childhood best friend, Lee Tourneau. Ig, in an episode of diabolic passion, releases the brake on his grandmother's wheelchair, and she goes rushing down a slope at a precarious speed.

Cherry
The high school past of Ig and Terry Perrish, Merrin Williams, and Lee Tourneau is explored, with the cherry as a common motif, referring to Merrin's red hair, the loss of virginity, and the characters' involvement with cherry bombs. Ig agrees to a bet: if he rides a shopping cart naked down a perilous trail in the woods by the Knowles River, he will receive a cherry bomb. Although he breaks his nose and briefly loses consciousness when he crashes into the river, Ig survives, believing that Lee Tourneau pulled him out of the water and resuscitated him. Ig and Lee immediately become friends, though Ig is pestered by the uncomfortable feeling of owing Lee a debt.

In church, Ig becomes infatuated with a red-headed girl who has been flirtatiously reflecting light off her cross necklace into his eyes. When the necklace breaks and, unnoticed by her, falls down, Ig collects it and decides to impress her by fixing it. But when Lee expresses an interest in her and shows him how to fix the necklace, Ig lets him have it instead. Later, Ig trades his cherry bomb with Lee in order to get back the cross. With this, Ig greets Merrin and the two soon become de facto girlfriend and boyfriend. Lee detonates the cherry bomb and damages his eye, which becomes milky and has impaired vision, though his other eye is unimpaired. Lee is also revealed to be a juvenile delinquent, having stolen and sold various items, perhaps as a way of venting his seemingly groundless hatred of his mother. Ig feels not only that he may be responsible for Lee's accident, but that Merrin should not go to the hospital with him to visit Lee, because Ig thinks it would be tantamount to gloating in Lee's face (having won the girl over Lee).

The Fire Sermon
The night of Merrin's murder is partially revealed; specifically, the drunken argument between her and Ig in a restaurant (the last time they see each other). Merrin explains that Ig, who is about to go to England for six months for his job, should openly pursue other women while there, in order to gain some more romantic experience (Merrin being his only romance ever). Ig is infuriated, thinking (correctly) that she wishes to permanently end their relationship and suspecting she may have been cheating on him. He drives away from the restaurant, leaving her in the rain. Later, at the airport, he is about to board the plane when he is suddenly surrounded by police officers.

In the present day, Ig goes to the congressman's office where Lee works and tells Lee he knows that Lee killed Merrin, but for some reason, he is unable to manipulate Lee with the horns. He also cannot attack Lee because of the congressman's security team, which includes Eric Hannity, another high school acquaintance. Ig drives back to the woods and the foundry and notices that snakes have started congregating around him. He listens to voice mails left by his friends and family on his cell phone and realizes that they think he is missing, having apparently not remembered just seeing him while under the mysterious influence of his horns. He drives back to his and Glenna's apartment where he is attacked by Eric, just narrowly escaping.

Returning to his parents' home, Ig touches a sleeping Terry's wrist and suddenly sees, from Terry's perspective, the events of the night of Merrin's murder: Terry is riding in Lee's car when they pick up Merrin, but is drunk and high and passes out while the actual murder takes place; later, Lee convinces Terry to keep quiet and five months later, a guilt-ridden Terry unsuccessfully attempts suicide. Although Terry begins to wake up, Ig discovers another power of his—he can perfectly mimic other voices— and convinces Terry that he is their mother, in the dark room, before departing.

Ig returns to the foundry where he finds an affinity with fire (and wine) and delivers a speech to the snakes. He asserts that the devil and women have always caused fear in God, with women being the more powerful because they, like God, have the power of creation. He argues that when Merrin decided to break away from him to pursue her own ends, God detested her and refused to come to her aid while she was being raped and murdered, all because He feared a "woman's power to choose who and how to love, to redefine love as she sees fit." God is a failed character too detested by his own creations to appreciate them. Ig concludes that only the devil loves humans for what they are, despite some of their negative characteristics.

The following morning at the foundry, Ig is abruptly assaulted by Lee, and the contact with him enlightens Ig as to just how Lee murdered Merrin. Ig finds that Lee is wearing Merrin's cross and tears it off him, leaving Lee exposed to the horns' influence. Lee viciously beats Ig and tosses him in Ig's AMC Gremlin, douses the car with gasoline, and lights it on fire. Ig is able to release the parking brake, and the car, ablaze, rolls down into the river, in imitation of Ig's journey in the shopping cart years earlier. The fire, though reddening Ig's skin, has somehow completely restored him to physical health, healing the damage from his fight with Lee. There is another flashback with Merrin, regarding the time she and Ig visited a mysterious treehouse in the woods filled with religious paraphernalia. The two have sex and then pray when suddenly someone startles them by banging on the door in the floor of the treehouse. They quickly dress as the pounding continues, but when they open the door, no one is there. They are never able to relocate the tree house and begin to believe they both imagined it, dubbing it the "Treehouse of the Mind."

The Fixer
Lee Tourneau's adult life (as a close associate of a Christian conservative congressman) and his sexual pursuit of Merrin is explored.  His mother acquired dementia and became weak and confused. Lee uses this as an opportunity to torture her, while pretending to be a loving, caring son whenever anyone visits. Ultimately she dies, and he uses her death as an excuse to become close to Merrin. He consistently finds more meaning than is intended from Merrin's gestures and choice of words, believing her to be sexually interested in him and, knowing that Ig will soon be leaving for Britain, eager to begin an affair with her. In reality, however, she means no such thing.

Lee also remembers an experience from his childhood in which he attempted to feed and befriend a stray cat, only to be swatted at, causing him to fall from a fence and hit his head; he is impaled in the head by the spike of a pitchfork and is severely brain damaged; he undergoes a hallucination in which he perceives things as God would, and murders the cat. When he returns, his mother perceives nothing wrong, not investigating the cause of but rather only reprimanding him for his blood stained pillow cases. It appears that from this point in time, his personality is changed and he has psychopathic thoughts. The section concludes with Lee's realization that Merrin never wanted a relationship with him, and his decision to rape and kill her.

The Gospel According to Mick and Keith
Ig is fully healed by the flames, but his clothes have burned off. Naked, he finds an old skirt and black overcoat to wear in the woods. He scoops up Merrin's cross and sees Dale Williams, Merrin's father, among a small crowd that has formed near the burnt car. Dale, against his will, gives Ig a ride to the Williams house, and the two discuss their conflicts and the death of Regan Williams, Merrin's older sister, from breast cancer, long before Ig and Merrin ever met.

Ig has a strange impulse to go the Williams' attic, seemingly having visions of the Treehouse of the Mind and its similar trap door. In the attic, Ig finds a group of papers written in Morse code and a mammogram that reveals that Merrin too had breast cancer. Ig deciphers the Morse code to read a note written to him by Merrin, who describes her feelings about knowing she will die from breast cancer; she encourages him to find another romantic partner, though she loves him; she says she believes in the gospel of Mick Jagger and Keith Richards, quoting from The Rolling Stones song "You Can't Always Get What You Want." It turns out she had decided she didn't want chemo, but she knew if she stayed with Ig, he would find out she had cancer and for love of him, she'd have chemo anyway. So she decided to break up with him and die on her own, to save him pain.

Ig reunites with Glenna, whom he convinces to lead a more fulfilling life, and when she accidentally leaves her cell phone, Ig uses it to call Lee and, mimicking Glenna's voice, persuades him to drive to the foundry, where Ig hopes to ambush and kill him. Terry unexpectedly arrives at the foundry, confessing that he has quit his TV job, though Ig begs that he flee. Lee's car arrives, and both Lee and Eric exit the vehicle, armed with guns and aware of Ig's trap, having talked to the real Glenna. Ig and Eric struggle for a time before Lee shoots and kills Eric, hoping that it will look as though Ig and Eric killed each other, without Lee's involvement. Lee then gorily beats Ig with the empty shotgun until Terry reappears, blasting his trumpet into Lee's ear. With this distraction, Ig finally slams his horns into Lee's body. He then telepathically convinces a snake to slide down Lee's throat, finishing him off. As Terry goes to use Glenna's phone to call emergency services, he is bitten by a venomous snake that Ig had placed there to attack Lee.

Desperately, the gruesomely injured Ig crawls over to a gasoline canister, hoping that he can light himself on fire quick enough to restore his diabolic flesh and get Terry to a hospital. As he prepares to self-immolate, Ig begins to remember in hazy flashback his activities of the night he was drunk the morning before he awoke to discover the horns: in his inebriated state, he miraculously came across the elusive Treehouse of the Mind and while knocking on the trap door, discovered that he was the one the younger versions of himself and Merrin had heard knocking on the door all along. The night before he grew horns, he climbed into it and set it on fire. The treehouse had rules written on a piece of parchment: "TAKE WHAT YOU WANT WHILE YOU'RE HERE/GET WHAT YOU NEED WHEN YOU LEAVE." He needed to kill the person who murdered Merrin, he felt, and began to feel a tingling near his temples (implying that this desire would later cause him to become devil-like).

Back in the present time, Ig is restored to health by the flames and tells Terry that he needs to lie about what has happened here; Eric and Lee are both dead, and Terry needs to believe that Ig died too. Ig then goes to the cherry tree that once held the Treehouse of the Mind to find that a line of fire has reached it from the foundry. The treehouse itself has reappeared beyond the flames and Ig climbs up into the burning tree, enters the treehouse, and finds a wedding party within and Merrin awaiting him.

Sometime later, Terry is recuperating from his snakebite, believing (thanks to the influence of Ig's horns) that Eric and Lee killed Ig by burning him in his car, and that the two then tortured Terry with a venomous snake, before they killed each other. Although the detective doubts that this story is true, Terry is the only living witness. Terry goes to the woods to have some peace of mind and is joined by Glenna. When she leaves to begin packing for her move to New York City, Terry believes he can hear the faint sound of a trumpet, and decides it is time for him to leave too.

The inner front and back cover of the book has a repeating message written in morse code. It reads, "Pleased to meet you; hope you guess my name," which are lyrics from the Rolling Stones song, "Sympathy for the Devil." It refers to the novel's themes that the devil is more of an anti-hero than a villain.

Background
Approximately a decade ago, Hill wrote an epic fantasy novel entitled The Fear Tree... that involved a character with the ability to divine people's most closely guarded secrets. This concept was reworked for a novel Hill wrote entitled The Surrealist's Glass, wherein the protagonist acquired a magical lens which allowed him to see people's secrets. Hill describes The Surrealist's Glass "as a confused, corrupt, first draft of Horns" to the degree that "several scenes in Horns appeared in a cruder earlier form in [The Surrealist's] Glass." According to Hill, "writers tend to revisit the same themes, tropes, places, and concerns, again and again, until they figure out how to use them in a satisfying way," which is what he did with this premise until he "finally got it right with Horns."

Reception
Horns was nominated for the 2010 Bram Stoker Award for Best Novel.

Film adaptation

On June 16, 2012, it was announced via Joe Hill's personal website that Mandalay Pictures and Red Granite Pictures would be making Horns, with Alexandre Aja directing, Daniel Radcliffe starring as Ignatius Perrish and Juno Temple as Merrin Williams. Horns premiered at the 2013 Toronto International Film Festival  and its US theatrical release was on October 31, 2014. Horns grossed a total of $3,347,106 worldwide in 31 days of release.

References

External links

2010 American novels
2010 fantasy novels
Dark fantasy novels
American gothic novels
American fantasy novels adapted into films
Novels by Joe Hill (writer)
Nonlinear narrative novels
William Morrow and Company books